Where the Air Is Clear is a 1958 novel by Mexican writer Carlos Fuentes. His first novel, it became an "instant classic" and made Fuentes into an immediate "literary sensation". The novel's success allowed Fuentes to leave his job as a diplomat and become a full-time author.

The novel is built around the story of Federico Robles – who has abandoned his revolutionary ideals to become a powerful financier – but also offers "a kaleidoscopic presentation" of vignettes of Mexico City, making it as much a "biography of the city" as of an individual man. It was celebrated not only for its prose, which made heavy use of interior monologue and explorations of the subconscious, but also for its "stark portrait of inequality and moral corruption in modern Mexico".

In November 2008, the Royal Spanish Academy (Real Academia Española) together with Spanish academies from all the world, released a special edition of the book to celebrate its 50th anniversary.

References

See also
 1958 in literature
 Mexican literature

1958 novels
Mexican novels
Novels by Carlos Fuentes
Novels set in Mexico City